Micrablepharus maximiliani is a species of lizard in the family Gymnophthalmidae. It is found in Brazil, Paraguay, Bolivia, and Peru.

References

Micrablepharus
Reptiles of Bolivia
Reptiles of Brazil
Reptiles of Paraguay
Reptiles of Peru
Reptiles described in 1862
Taxa named by Johannes Theodor Reinhardt
Taxa named by Christian Frederik Lütken